Johari Johnson is an American actress, director, comedian, screenwriter and producer.

Career

Johnson has guest starred in a number of notable television series including Moesha, The Steve Harvey Show, Smart Guy, In the House, Eve, Cory in the House, Mr. Show with Bob and David and among other series. She has also guest starred numerous times on The Fresh Prince of Bel-Air and the Disney Channel Original Series That's So Raven, each time playing a different character on both series.

Johnson has her own YouTube channel in which she writes, produces and directs a number videos parodying celebrities such as Whitney Houston, Tameka Cottle and Nicki Minaj.

Filmography

Film

Television

References

External links

Johari Johnson on Myspace

20th-century American actresses
21st-century American actresses
Actresses from Chicago
African-American female comedians
African-American actresses
American film actresses
American television actresses
Living people
American women comedians
American women screenwriters
Screenwriters from Illinois
Place of birth missing (living people)
Year of birth missing (living people)
Comedians from Illinois
20th-century American comedians
21st-century American comedians
20th-century African-American women
20th-century African-American people
21st-century African-American women
21st-century African-American people